Below are the rosters for the 2009 CONCACAF U-20 Championship held in Trinidad and Tobago from March 6–15, 2009.

Canada 
Coach: Tony Fonseca

Costa Rica

El Salvador 
Coach: Norberto Huezo

Honduras 
Coach: Emilio Umanzor

Jamaica 

Coach: Donovan Duckie

Mexico 

Coach: Juan Carlos Chávez

Trinidad & Tobago 
Head coach:  Zoran Vraneš

United States 

The United States roster was announced by on February 23, 2009.

Coach: Thomas Rongen

References 

2009 CONCACAF U-20 Championship squads
squads